Algis Iozasovich Arlauskas Pinedo (born August 7, 1957) is a Russian-Spanish actor, director and theater teacher.

Life and career 
Algis Arlauskas was born on August 7, 1957 in Moscow, then the Soviet Union (now Russia). His father, Ionas Mikolasovich Arlauskas (born in 1920), was a leader of the Lithuanian Communist Party and was condemned to work camps and his mother an evacuee from Bilbao (Basque Country) following the Spanish Civil War in 1937 (these evacuees are known as "war children").

In 1978 he graduated from the Boris Shchukin Theater Institute (Higher School of Drama attached to the Vakhtangov Theater in Moscow), and in 1987 he graduated from the Film Directing faculty of the State Institute of Cinematography - VGIK (workshop of A. Kochetkov). He was also from 1978 to 1983 an actor of the Moscow Young Spectators Theater.

Between 1989 and 1995 he worked as a professor of film directing and screenwriting at the Russian State Institute of Cinematography - VGIK (Faculty of Documentary Film).

In 1991, as a returnee, he arrived in Bilbao with his former wife, the actress Marina Shimanskaya, and their 2 children to make a series of documentaries on the Children of the Spanish Civil War entitled Living and Dying in Russia, and after offering him several projects as a director, he remained to reside in the Biscayan capital.

He has worked as an actor, director and screenwriter in various film and television projects in the Basque Country and Spain. In 2008 he returned to work on Russian film projects.

He speaks Russian, Spanish, Basque, English, Italian and Portuguese.

Filmography 

 1974, Grumete de la Flota del Norte, Gorky Studio URSS
 1982, Sportloto-82, Mosfilm URSS
 1983, Soborno, TV Central URSS
 1986, Peter the Great, NBC USA
 2010, Los hombres de Paco, Antena 3
 2011 - 2013, El barco, Antena 3
 2014, Hermanos, Telecinco
 2014 - 2015, El Príncipe, Telecinco
 2015, B&B, de boca en boca, Telecinco
 2015 - 2016, Amar es para siempre, Antena 3
 2016, El ministerio del tiempo, La 1
 2018, Acacias 38, La 1
 2019, Vota Juan, TNT Spain
 2020, Caronte, Amazon Prime
 2021, La Fortuna, Movistar+ Spain
 2022, In from the cold, Netflix USA

References

External links 

 

1957 births
Living people
Male actors from Moscow
Soviet male film actors
Russian film actors
Russian emigrants to Spain
Drama teachers